Ladyzhynka is a village in Uman Raion of Cherkasy Oblast of Ukraine. It is located approximately 22 km from the raion's administrative center. It hosts the administration of Ladyzhynka rural hromada, one of the hromadas of Ukraine. As of 2009, its population was 2,286.

References

External links

Ladyzhynka on  Ukrainian Parliament website 
 
 

Umansky Uyezd

Villages in Uman Raion